Prakash Jitendrabhai Bhatt is an Indian cricket match referee and former domestic cricketer.

References

External links

1952 births
Living people
Indian cricketers
Saurashtra cricketers